Theodore Birkett (born 14 April 1918, date of death unknown) was a Barbadian cricketer. He played in two first-class matches for the Barbados cricket team in 1942/43 and 1956/57.

See also
 List of Barbadian representative cricketers

References

External links
 

1918 births
Year of death missing
Barbadian cricketers
Barbados cricketers
People from Saint Michael, Barbados